The Fort Saskatchewan Chiefs also known as the  Fort Hotel Chiefs, were a senior AAA-level ice hockey team based in Fort Saskatchewan, Alberta, Canada. They competed within the Allan Cup Hockey West league (formerly Chinook Hockey League) from the 2003-04 season to the 2018–19 season.

History
The 2005-06 season was the Chiefs most successful as they posted an 18-3-3 regular-season record, and defeated both  the Bentley Generals and Stony Plain Eagles to win the provincial title and a berth in the 2006 Allan Cup.  At the Allan Cup tournament, they advanced past the quarter-finals with a 5-2 win over the Weyburn Devils, before losing the semi-finals match to the Whitby Dunlops by a score of 4-0.

The Chiefs were eliminated in the Chinook Hockey League's semi-final by the Innisfail Eagles 4-games-to-1.

References

Senior ice hockey teams
Ice hockey teams in Alberta
Fort Saskatchewan